Deivam Thantha Poove (DTP) is a 2021 Indian Tamil-language drama airing on Zee Tamil and streams on ZEE5. It premiered on 13 December 2021 along with Peranbu.

It initially stars Nishma Chengappa and Amruth Kalam in the lead roles. and the story is Mithra enters into a contract marriage with Vinay, who is diagnosed with cancer. After 6-year leap, it stars Sree Nidhi, (replacement of Nishma) and Amruth Kalam. Now the story focuses on the union of Mithra and Vinay.

Deivam Thandha Poove held a Sunday Special Episode titled as "Deivam Thandha Poove Sirappu Thogupu" on April 10, 2022 with many twists and turns.

Synopsis

Season 1
Mithra from a poor background, comes out from the family for to settle the lend money of her father. But things takes turn, she faces lots of struggles to live in a new place, accidentally she met Dr. Ramakrishnan and seeks for help. Ramakrishna provides a shelter and job to Mithra. Ramakrishna's son Vinay, affected from Cancer and his father and mother Vasuki searches for Bride, as Vinay's lover and fiancée Thara rejects him because he has Cancer disease. So Mithra decide to marry Vinay has in the form of Contract marriage by getting money because her main motto is to settle the lend money. Later Mithra falls towards Vinay by his caring.

Season 2
Due to Deepika's (Vinay's friend) evil plan, Vinay believed that Mithra was in affair and he can't accept be the father for Mithra's pregnancy. Mithra feels bad about Vinay and took the DNA test. Finally the result came positive and Vinay was shocked.

Vinay pleased Mithra, but Mithra leaves him as he was not believed her truly. After 6 years, Mithra blessed with boy baby Vikram and living in Gandhimati's house as a servant. Now Vinay and their family in search of Mithra.

Cast

Season 1
Main
 Nishma Chengappa (2021–2022) as Mithra: Vikram's mother; Vinay's wife; she married Vinay for money as a contract marriage and she works in Ramakrishnan's hospital
 Amruth Kalam as Vinay: Mithra's husband; he is affected by Cancer and finally cured.

Supporting
 Sridhar Subramaniyam as Dr. Ramakrishnan: Vinay's father; Mithra's father-in-law; Vasuki's husband
 Harsha Nair as Vasuki: Vinay's mother; Mithra's mother-in-law; Ramakrishnan's wife
 Nancy as Deepa: Mithra's friend; she works as Nurse in Ramakrishnan's hospital
 Gayathri Priya as Uma: Mithra and Tharani's mom
 Murali Krish as Arun: Vasuki's younger brother; Vinay's uncle
 Poraali Dileepan as Ragu: Ramakrishnan's younger brother
 VJ Santhiya (2021–2022) / Minnal Deepa (2022) as Vasanthi: Ramakrishnan's younger sister-in-law
 Uma Maheswari as Tharani: Mithra's younger sister
 Sandhya Ramachandran as Thara: Vinay's ex-fiancée
 Sailu Imran (2022) / Nithya Raj (2022) as Deepika: Vinay's friend
 Jay Srinivas as Ashwin: he loved Mithra and works in Ramakrishnan's hospital

Season 2
Main
 Sree Nithi (2022–present) as Mithra: She was away from Vinay and her family and staying in Karthik's house (Replacement of Nishma)
 Amruth Kalam as Vinay: Mithra's husband, who was in search of Mithra and his son Vikram

Supporting
 Shanthi Williams as Gandhimati: Karthik's mother
 Satvik Dev as Vikram: Vinay and Mithra's son
 Sridhar Subramaniyam as Dr. Ramakrishnan: Vinay's father; Mithra's father-in-law; Vasuki's husband
 Harsha Nair as Vasuki: Vinay's mother; Mithra's mother-in-law; Ramakrishnan's wife
 Murali Krish as Arun: Vasuki's younger brother; Vinay's uncle
 Ajai Bharat as Karthik: Gandhimati's son; Mithra's boss
 Preetha Suresh as Thenmozhi: Gandhimati's granddaughter

References

External links 
 
 Deivam Thantha Poove at ZEE5

Zee Tamil original programming
Tamil-language romance television series
2021 Tamil-language television series debuts
Tamil-language television soap operas
Television shows set in Tamil Nadu
Tamil-language television shows